Theatrhythm may refer to:
 Theatrhythm Final Fantasy
 Theatrhythm Final Fantasy: Curtain Call
 Theatrhythm Dragon Quest
 Theatrhythm Final Bar Line

Square Enix franchises